The Miami Grand Prix is a Formula One Grand Prix which forms part of the 2022 Formula One World Championship, with the event taking place at the Miami International Autodrome on a ten-year contract.

History
In 2018, a proposal for the Miami Grand Prix as a round of the Formula One World Championship was submitted to the city of Miami, with  proposed as the first date for the race and its location around PortMiami. After complications arose due to PortMiami's construction and development plans, a proposal was submitted for a 2021 race at Hard Rock Stadium. The track then moved locations from the downtown area to the area near Hard Rock Stadium and its nearby parking lots. The race did not make it to the 2021 calendar, which saw the debut of a street circuit in Jeddah for the inaugural Saudi Arabian Grand Prix, and was announced in April 2021 for the 2022 calendar. The event was a part of the 2022 Formula One World Championship, with the race taking place at the Miami International Autodrome on a ten-year contract. The inaugural Miami Grand Prix took place on May 8, 2022.

Circuit

The circuit, designed and delivered by Formula One track designers Apex Circuit Design, was purpose built for the event, with several potential track designs proposed and tested. Stephen M. Ross, owner of the stadium, had been trying to bring about the Miami Grand Prix for several years before being successful. The circuit layout is designed in a way that local residents would not be disrupted by the races. The track is a permanent style circuit with temporary infrastructure, such as barriers and fences, which will be removed when there is no racing. As of April 2022, ahead of its debut in May 2022, the track was reported to be 95% complete.

Winners

By year
All Miami Grands Prix were held at the Miami International Autodrome.

References

 
Formula One Grands Prix
Recurring sporting events established in 2022
2022 establishments in the United States
Motorsport in Miami